Richard Lee "Buddy" Booker (born May 28, 1942) is an American former professional baseball player. He played in Major League Baseball as a catcher for the Cleveland Indians in 1966 and the Chicago White Sox in 1968.

Booker was born in Lynchburg, Virginia and earned most of his prep accolades as a William Campbell High School basketball player in Naruna, Virginia. He broke the Virginia state scoring record with 719 points during the 1960 season.

He was a Carolina League All-Star in 1962 with the Burlington Indians, and after some short stints in Low-A ball, he advanced to Triple-A.  Booker retired from the Milwaukee Brewers’ organization in 1974.

Booker was the President of Brookneal Dixie Youth baseball for seven years. Booker later received the Brookneal Town Council Good Citizen Award for his work with Dixie Youth and Babe Ruth baseball.

Booker was one of six inductees into the Lynchburg Area Sports Hall of Fame on June 20, 2007

External links

1942 births
Living people
Cleveland Indians players
Chicago White Sox players
Major League Baseball catchers
Hawaii Islanders players
Richmond Braves players
Portland Beavers players
Charleston Charlies players
Evansville Triplets players
Jacksonville Suns players
Batavia Pirates players
Charleston Indians players
Burlington Indians players (1958–1964)
Sportspeople from Lynchburg, Virginia
Baseball players from Virginia